Tuula Irmeli Haatainen (born 11 February 1960) is a Finnish politician and a member of the Finnish Parliament, with the Social Democratic Party. She was the Minister of Education 2003–2005 and the Minister of Social Affairs and Health 2005–2007.

In 2007 Haatainen was chosen as the Deputy Mayor of Helsinki and she left the parliament. She returned to the parliament following the 2015 elections, in which she received 6,662 personal votes.

On 2 September 2017, Haatainen was nominated as the candidate of the Social Democratic Party in 2018 presidential election. In the election, Haatainen placed sixth with 3.3 percent of the votes, while the incumbent president Sauli Niinistö went on to secure his second term with a majority of votes.

After the presidential election, on 5 February 2018, Haatainen was elected as the Second Deputy Speaker of the Parliament. She served in the position until the collapse of Rinne Cabinet in December 2019, after which she joined the subsequent Marin Cabinet as Minister of Employment.
She is a trained nurse and has practised in her home region of Northern Savonia, and in Åland.

Honors 

  Legion of Honour (France, 2019)

References

1960 births
Living people
People from Tuusniemi
Social Democratic Party of Finland politicians
Ministers of Education of Finland
Ministers of Social Affairs of Finland
Members of the Parliament of Finland (1995–99)
Members of the Parliament of Finland (1999–2003)
Members of the Parliament of Finland (2003–07)
Members of the Parliament of Finland (2015–19)
Members of the Parliament of Finland (2019–23)
Candidates for President of Finland
Women government ministers of Finland
Women members of the Parliament of Finland
21st-century Finnish women politicians